The Penske PC-5 was Penske Racing's first USAC Indy car. It was designed by British designer Geoff Ferris, and was constructed for competition in the 1977 season.

References

Racing cars
American Championship racing cars